Heliozela glabrata is a moth of the family Heliozelidae. It was described by Lee, Hirowatari and Kuroko in 2006. It is found in Japan (Honshu).

The forewings are greyish ochreous with brassy reflections. The hindwings are dark grey with metallic reflections.

References

External links

Moths described in 2006
Endemic fauna of Japan
Heliozelidae
Moths of Japan